Manturovsky District is an administrative and municipal district (raion), one of the twenty-four in Kostroma Oblast, Russia. It is located in the center of the oblast. Its administrative center is the town of Manturovo (which is not administratively a part of the district). Population:  6,796 (2002 Census);

Administrative and municipal status
Within the framework of administrative divisions, Manturovsky District is one of the twenty-four in the oblast. The town of Manturovo serves as its administrative center, despite being incorporated separately as a town of oblast significance—an administrative unit with the status equal to that of the districts.

As a municipal division, the district is incorporated as Manturovsky Municipal District. The town of oblast significance of Manturovo is incorporated separately from the district as Manturovo Urban Okrug.

References

Notes

Sources

Districts of Kostroma Oblast
 
